Nigel Tausie Ashton Simpson (born 25 April 1975) is a former English rugby union player.

Biography
Simpson was born in Suva, Fiji and is of Rotuman and English descent. His mother is Rotuman from Malha'a, Rotuma and his father is English.

Rugby career 
Simpson played for the England sevens team from 2000 to 2002. He scored 29 tries from 33 games for the side. He captained the team at the 2001 London Sevens.

Simpson usually played on the wing. He spent the 1999–2000 Premiership Rugby season playing for Bath. He then joined Rotherham for a season before moving to Pontypridd. He has also played for Plymouth Albion and Launceston.

References

1975 births
Living people
Bath Rugby players
English rugby union players
Plymouth Albion R.F.C. players
Pontypridd RFC players
Rotherham Titans players
Sportspeople from Suva
Fijian people of English descent
Fijian people of Rotuman descent
Fijian expatriate sportspeople in England
Fijian expatriate sportspeople in Wales
Rugby union wings